The Battle of Siranaya was a battle fought between the Philippines and the United States during the Philippine–American War.  Leonard Wood led a force against Datu Ali in the Cotabato Valley in retaliation for refusing to obey an antislavery law. Wood used a force of five companies and an artillery battery with a 3.2 inch piece to attack Ali's cotta and several thousand Moros.  The cotta surrendered after two days of American shelling but not before Ali and most of his men fled. 
  The Moros left behind 21 Spanish cannons and 72 Lantakas.  Secretary of War William Taft criticized Wood afterwards for the excessive use of force and brutality.

References

Conflicts in 1902
1902 in the Philippines
Philippine Revolution
Philippine–American War
Battles involving the United States
Battles of the Philippine–American War
History of Cotabato